The Education Workforce Council (EWC), or  (CGA), is the regulator in Wales for teachers in maintained schools, further education teachers and associated learning support staff. The EWC was established on 1 April 2015 by the Education (Wales) Act 2014, under which the General Teaching Council for Wales was reconfigured and renamed to become the EWC. The Welsh Government intends to expand the EWC's remit from 1 April 2017 to regulate youth workers and people involved in work-based learning.

References

External links
Official site

Education in Wales
Education regulators
Professional associations based in Wales
Teaching in the United Kingdom